Vladimír Barbora (born 2 January 2001) is a Slovak footballer who plays for Pohronie as a defender.

Club career

Loan at Senica
Barbora made his Fortuna Liga debut for Senica against iClinic Sereď on 12 August 2020.

FK Pohronie
In June 2022, Barbora was introduced by Pohronie as a new signing ahead of a 2. Liga season, as a part of a Spať ku koreňom (Back to grassroots) campaign, aiming to sign local players and rediscover clubs original path, following relegation from top division. Barbora arrived after over a year with Železiarne Podbrezová arriving to the club together with former club-mates Samuel Urgela and Viktor Tatár.

References

External links
 FK Senica official club profile 
 MŠK Žilina official club profile 
 Futbalnet profile 
 
 

2001 births
Living people
People from Žarnovica
Sportspeople from the Banská Bystrica Region
Slovak footballers
Slovakia under-21 international footballers
Association football defenders
MŠK Žilina players
FK Senica players
FK Železiarne Podbrezová players
FK Pohronie players
2. Liga (Slovakia) players
Slovak Super Liga players